SRY is the HUGO Gene Nomenclature Committee assigned symbol for the mammalian gene "sex determining region Y".

SRY is an abbreviation that can also mean:
 Southern Railway of British Columbia
 Shoeburyness railway station (National Rail station code SRY)
 Surrey (Chapman code SRY and ISO 3166-2:GB geocode GB-SRY)
 Dasht-e Naz Airport IATA code
 "Sorry" (see Suffering), as a slang abbreviation for an expression of sympathy for another's suffering